Pseudocossus uliginosus is a moth in the family Cossidae. It was described by George Hamilton Kenrick in 1914. It is found on Madagascar.

References

Moths described in 1914
Pseudocossinae
Taxa named by George Hamilton Kenrick